Total petroleum hydrocarbons (TPH) is a term used for any mixture of hydrocarbons that are found in crude oil. There are several hundred of these compounds, but not all occur in any one sample. Crude oil is used to make petroleum products, which can contaminate the environment. Because there are so many different chemicals in crude oil and in other petroleum products, it is not practical to measure each one separately. However, it is useful to measure the total amount of TPH at a site.  Chemicals that occur in TPH include hexane, benzene, toluene, xylenes, naphthalene, and fluorene, other constituents of gasoline, jet fuels, mineral oils, and of other petroleum products. Petroleum Hydrocarbon ranges are monitored at various levels depending on the state and testing site.

TPH is the sum of volatile petroleum hydrocarbons (VPH) and extractable petroleum hydrocarbons (EPH). VPH is also known as petrol (or gasoline) range organics (PRO or GRO) and includes hydrocarbons from C6-C10. Diesel range organics (DRO) includes hydrocarbons from C10-C28.

Various methods to analyze the components of TPH are introduced in a Nordic report. The report evaluates critically various new methods replacing the old ones using banned ozone depleting substances.

References

External links
http://www.cheiron-resources.com/glossary.php Glossary of Technical Terms for Oil and Other Hydrocarbon Leak Detection and Site Remediation

Analytical chemistry